Breakthrough Brits is a programme to honour some of Britain's best new creatives in film, television, and gaming. The programme was originally run by the now shuttered UK Film Council. It was then launched under BAFTA in 2013. There are also international categories under BAFTA Breakthrough.

The program was designed to celebrate the new British film-making talent. The 2008 programme ended in a special event in Los Angeles, compered by Nigel Lythgoe, on 5 June where honourees were presented to an audience of Hollywood industry figures.

UK Film Council

BAFTA

References

External links
Wed 11 June 2008 Variety
Sun 15 June 2008 Guardian
Wed 2 July 2008 BBC Entertainment News

British film awards
Breakthrough